The 1962–63 NBA season was the Detroit Pistons' 15th season in the NBA and sixth season in the city of Detroit.

The Pistons finished with a 34-46 (.425) record, 3rd place in the Western Division.  The team would advance to the 1963 NBA Playoffs, losing their first round series 3-1 to the St. Louis Hawks.  The team was led by forward Bailey Howell (22.7 ppg, 11.5 rpg, NBA All-Star), guard Don Ohl (19.3 ppg) and rookie forward Dave DeBusschere from the University of Detroit (12.7 ppg, 8.7 rpg, All-Rookie Team), who was the team's top pick in the 1962 NBA Draft.

Regular season

Season standings

x – clinched playoff spot

Record vs. opponents

Game log

Playoffs

|- align="center" bgcolor="#ffcccc"
| 1
| March 20
| @ St. Louis
| L 99–118
| Dave DeBusschere (30)
| Dave DeBusschere (18)
| Don Ohl (6)
| Kiel Auditorium5,818
| 0–1
|- align="center" bgcolor="#ffcccc"
| 2
| March 22
| @ St. Louis
| L 108–122
| Scott, Ohl (29)
| Scott, Howell (9)
| Don Ohl (6)
| Kiel Auditorium
| 0–2
|- align="center" bgcolor="#ccffcc"
| 3
| March 24
| St. Louis
| W 107–103
| DeBusschere, Ferry (23)
| Dave DeBusschere (26)
| Jones, Ohl (4)
| Cobo Arena3,232
| 1–2
|- align="center" bgcolor="#ffcccc"
| 4
| March 26
| St. Louis
| L 100–104
| Don Ohl (32)
| Ray Scott (14)
| Ray Scott (6)
| Cobo Arena3,257
| 1–3
|-

Awards and records
Bailey Howell, All-NBA Second Team
Dave DeBusschere, NBA All-Rookie Team 1st Team

References

Detroit Pistons seasons
Detroit
Detroit Pistons
Detroit Pistons